José Luis García Vayá (born 11 August 1998), commonly known as Pepelu, is a Spanish footballer who plays as a central midfielder for Levante UD.

Club career
Born in Dénia, Alicante, Valencian Community, Pepelu joined Levante UD's youth setup in 2012, after starting it out at CD Dénia. On 24 June 2014, while still a youth, he renewed his contract until 2021, and made his senior debut with the reserve team on 7 September, coming on as a half-time substitute in a Tercera División 1–1 home draw against CD Castellón.

On 15 December 2015 Pepelu made his first team debut, replacing Juanfran in a 1–2 Copa del Rey away loss against RCD Espanyol. In August 2017, he was loaned to Hércules CF in Segunda División B, for one season.

Upon returning from loan, Pepelu was a regular starter for the B-side also in the third division, scoring a career-best six goals during the 2018–19 campaign. On 26 July 2019, he moved abroad for the first time in his career after agreeing to a one-year loan deal with Primeira Liga side C.D. Tondela. A year later, he saved the club from relegation with a late penalty 2–1 winner at Moreirense F.C. on the final day, at Portimonense SC's expense.

On 8 September 2020, Pepelu remained in Portugal for a further campaign, after agreeing to a one-year loan deal with Vitória S.C. Upon returning to Levante in July 2021, he became a regular starter for the side under manager Alessio Lisci.

In June 2022, Pepelu signed a new ten-year contract with Levante running until the summer of 2032.

References

External links

1998 births
Living people
People from Marina Alta
Sportspeople from the Province of Alicante
Spanish footballers
Footballers from the Valencian Community
Association football midfielders
Segunda División B players
Tercera División players
Atlético Levante UD players
Levante UD footballers
Primeira Liga players
C.D. Tondela players
Vitória S.C. players
Spain youth international footballers
Spain under-21 international footballers
Spanish expatriate footballers
Spanish expatriate sportspeople in Portugal
Expatriate footballers in Portugal